The Tanûkhids or Tanukh or Banū Tanūkh were a confederation of Arab tribes, sometimes characterized as Saracens. They first rose to prominence in northern Arabia and southern Syria in the 2nd century CE. Both Lakhmid and Tanukhid inscriptions have been found at Umm el-Jimal in Jordan and Namara in Syria. The ancient Tanukh tribal confederation was largely taken over by several branches of the large Azd and Quda'a tribes. Their main base during the time of their most famous ruler, Queen Mavia, was in Aleppo. During the 8th and 9th centuries, the Tanukhid strongholds were the cities of Qinnasrin and Maarat al-Numan.

History
In the late 2nd century, a branch of the tribe of Azd, from Southern Arabia, migrated to al-Hasa where Tanukhids were settling. The Azdies allied with the Tanukhids, becoming part of the confederation. The two sheikhs (tribal leaders) gave up the rule to Malik ibn Fahm (196–231), who led them into what is now Iraq and Syria, and after skirmishing with other tribes in the area, he controlled all of Jordan, and parts of Iraq, he was succeeded by his brother 'Amr ibn Fahm who reigned for a short period, and after him Jadhima ibn Malik reigned (233–268). After Jadhima's death, he was succeeded by his sister's son 'Amr ibn Adi, a Lakhmid, because Jadhima had no sons, thus establishing the Lakhmid dynasty. Other Tanukhids settled in Syria. 'Amr ibn 'Adi is claimed in the Arab legends to have been the sole victor in the war against Zenobia's Palmyrene Empire, but these myths "are probably an amalgam of fact and fiction." It is clear, however, that the Tanukhids played a key role in the defeat of Zenobia's forces by Emperor Aurelian.

In the 4th century AD, the Tanukhids became the first Arab tribe to serve as foederati (allies) in the Roman East. Their territory spanned from Syria in the north to the Gulf of Aqaba, areas into which they had migrated from southern Arabia after the rise of Sassanian influence in Yemen a century earlier. They are reported to have been devoted to Christianity, Thomas the Apostle and monasticism, with many monasteries associated with the tribe. In 378, their Queen Mavia led them in a revolt against Emperor Valens. A truce was struck and was respected for a time, with Mavia even sending a fleet of cavalry in response to Roman requests for assistance in staving off an attack by the Goths. The alliance crumbled under Theodosius I, with the Tanukhids again revolting against Roman rule.

The Tanukhids were Christianised in the 3rd or 4th centuries, likely while in the eastern half of the fertile crescent, and by the 4th century they were described as having a "fanatic zeal for Christianity" and were "zealous Christian soldiers" in the 6th century. In the 7th century, during the Muslim conquest of the Levant, the Tanukhids fought with the Romans against the Muslims, including in the Battle of Yarmouk. After Yarmouk, their status as foederati ended. They were described as an "autonomous Christian community in Bilad al-Sham" up until the reign of the Abbasid caliph al-Mahdi, after which they appear as Muslims. Their conversion to Islam is believed to have been forced upon them by al-Mahdi.

In the 11th century, the Tanukhids of Mount Lebanon inaugurated the Druze community in Lebanon, when most of them accepted and adopted the new message, due to their leadership's close ties with then Fatimid caliph al-Hakim bi-Amr Allah. In the 14th century, the central parts of Mount Lebanon were described as a Tanukhid stronghold, housing both Druze and Shiite Muslims. Members of the Tanukhids in Mount Lebanon include Al-Sayyid al-Tanukhi, a prominent 15th century Druze theologian and commentator; and Muhammad bin al-Muwaffaq al-Tanukhi, an emir and Shiite Muslim who lived in the 13th century.

See also
Queen Mavia
Azd
Iturea

References

Bibliography

Further reading 
Shahîd, Rome and the Arabs: a Prolegomenon to the Study of Byzantium and the Arabs  (Washington: Dumbarton Oaks) 1984. The opening volume of Shahîd's multi-volume history of Byzantium and the Arabs.

 
196 establishments
1100 disestablishments
States and territories established in the 190s
States and territories disestablished in the 1100s
Ancient Arabic peoples
History of Saudi Arabia
Late Roman Syria
Late Roman military units
Roman Syria
Arabs in the Roman Empire
Former confederations
Barbarian kingdoms